Kayapınar is a Turkish word. It may refer to:

Surname
Hamdi Kayapınar (born 1979), Turkish serial killer

Places
Kayapınar, Balya, a village
Kayapınar, Biga
Kayapınar, Gercüş, a town in Gercüş district of Batman Province, Turkey
Kayapınar, İnegöl
Kayapınar, Taşköprü, a village in Turkey
Kayapınar, Tavas
Kayapınar, Tufanbeyli, a village in Tufanbeyli district of Adana Province, Turkey